Belhaven City Hall is a historic city hall building located at Belhaven, Beaufort County, North Carolina.  It was built in 1910–1911, and is a 2 1/2-story, brick building.  It features a wood-shingled pediment and belfry. The building's first floor originally housed meat and market stalls.

It was listed on the National Register of Historic Places in 1981.

References

City and town halls on the National Register of Historic Places in North Carolina
Government buildings completed in 1911
Buildings and structures in Beaufort County, North Carolina
National Register of Historic Places in Beaufort County, North Carolina
1911 establishments in North Carolina
Historic Albemarle Tour
City and town halls in North Carolina